Joseph Zhang is the name of:

Zhang Dapeng (1754–1815), Roman Catholic martyr during the Qing dynasty
Joseph Zhang Xianwang (born 1965), Chinese Roman Catholic priest
Joseph Zhang Weizhu (born 1967), Chinese Roman Catholic priest
Joseph Zhang Yinlin (born 1971), Chinese Roman Catholic priest
Joseph Chang (born 1983), Taiwanese actor

See also
Joe Cheung (born 1944), Hong Kong filmmaker and actor